Eppu Normaali is one of the most popular rock bands in Finland. The band formed in 1976 in Ylöjärvi, a small town near Tampere. The band is the best-selling music artist in Finland, with certified sales of nearly two million records,  and it has also gained success especially in the use of the Finnish language in rock lyrics. In addition to their studio albums, Eppu Normaali also released live records, DVDs, and over 20 singles.

Eppu Normaali's most famous songs include "Vuonna '85" (In the Year '85), "Kitara, taivas ja tähdet" (The Guitar, the Sky and the Stars), "Murheellisten laulujen maa" (The Land of Sorrowful Songs), "Pimeyden tango" (Tango of Darkness), "Suolaista sadetta" (Salty Rain) and "Tahroja paperilla" (Stains on the Paper).

History

The members of the original band were Juha Torvinen (guitar), Mikko Saarela (bass), Aku Syrjä (drums), and brothers Martti Syrjä (vocals) and Mikko "Pantse" Syrjä (guitar). (The brothers are the sons of accomplished writers Kirsi Kunnas and Jaakko Syrjä). In 1979, bassist Mikko Saarela left the band, and Mikko Nevalainen played bass with Eppu Normaali until 1989. The current bassist is Sami Ruusukallio.

The band took its name from a character in the Mel Brooks movie Young Frankenstein, and the subtitler translated the name of the character Abby Normal (abnormal) into the Finnish equivalent Eppu Normaali (epänormaali, roughly 'abnormal'; a Finnish equivalent of the original play with words).

In 1977, the band participated in a local rock music competition. Finnish folk/pop legend Juice Leskinen was present and issued a demand that they "must win", but the judges were unimpressed—the band did not win. The band began sending demos to various record companies and they were soon signed to Poko Rekords.

They initially released albums in a punk pop style that gained favourable reviews, but the band did not gain mainstream acceptance until 1984 with what had evolved into a more AOR-oriented music style. Rupisia Riimejä Karmeita Tarinoita was released in 1984, and it was followed by Kahdeksas Ihme in 1985 and Valkoinen Kupla in 1986. This trio of albums were all hits, with combined sales of over 300,000 copies. Kahdeksas Ihme is their top-selling non-greatest hits record to date.

Although their albums all sold well, the band decided to take a break in 1989 after intensive tours around the country and when Mikko Nevalainen left the group. In 1993, they released Studio Etana, which was to become their last studio album for eleven years. The band came close to breaking up, citing "lacking inspiration" as the primary cause. Their 1996 release Repullinen hittejä, a greatest hits compilation sold over 240,000 copies, reaching the top of the Finnish charts. This record also stayed on the charts for over two years, a duration which is second of all time in Finland. After its release, the band effectively stopped touring or performing live.

In 2004, the band announced they would record a new album, Sadan vuoden päästäkin, which became one of the band's most successful releases. In 2007, they released their most recent album, Syvään päähän.

In 2016, the band celebrated its 40th anniversary with a documentary film, book, photo exhibition and a massive show on Ratina stadium. The stadium concert had over 30 000 spectators.

Discography

Studio albums

 Aknepop (Acne pop) (1978)
 Maximum Jee&Jee (1979)
 Akun tehdas (Aku's Factory) (1980)
 Cocktail Bar - Musiikkia Rantalasta (Cocktail Bar — Music from Rantala) (1981)
 Tie vie (The Road Carries) (1982)
 Aku ja köyhät pojat (Aku and the Poor Boys) (1983)
 Rupisia riimejä karmeita tarinoita (Scabby Rhymes and Frightening Stories) (1984)
 Kahdeksas ihme (Eighth Wonder) (1985)
 Valkoinen kupla (White Bubble) (1986)
 Imperiumin vastaisku (The Empire Strikes Back) (1988)
 Historian suurmiehiä (Great Men of History) (1990)
 Studio Etana (Studio Snail) (1993)
 Sadan vuoden päästäkin (Even After a Hundred Years) (2004)
 Syvään päähän (To the Deep End) (2007)
 Mutala (2011)
 Mutala, Pure Audio Blu-ray (2012)

Live albums
 Elävänä Euroopassa (Alive in Europe) (1980)
 Onko vielä pitkä matka jonnekin? (Is there still a long way to somewhere?) (1994)

Compilation albums
 Pop pop pop (Pop pop pop) (1982)
 Hatullinen paskaa (A hatful of shit) (1984)
 Aku, Juha, Martti ja Mikko² - soolot (Aku, Juha, Martti and Mikko² - solos) (1987)
 Poko-klassikko (Poko-classic) (1987)
 Lyömättömät (Unbeatables) (1989)
 Hatullinen paskaa/Soolot (A hatful of shit/Solos) (1990)
 Paskahatun paluu (Shithat's return) (1991)
 Repullinen hittejä (A bagful of hits) (1996)
 Reppu 2 - toinen repullinen kuolemattomia Eppu-klassikoita (Bag 2 - another bagful of immortal Eppu-classics) (2003)
 Singlet 1978–2003 (Singles 1978–2003) (2003)
 Jackpot - 101 Eppu-klassikkoa 1978–2009 (Jackpot - 101 Eppu-classics 1978–2009) (6 CD, 2009)

Filmography 
 The Saimaa Gesture (1981)

See also
List of best-selling music artists in Finland

References

External links
 Eppunormaali.fi Official home page
 Eppunormaali.net Fan page

Finnish punk rock groups
Musical groups established in 1976
1976 establishments in Finland